Giorgio Rossi Cairo (Varese, 15 July 1947) is an Italian entrepreneur. 
He is managing director of Value Partners, the management consulting multinational he founded in 1993.

Biography 
Degree in Aerospace Engineering from the Polytechnic University of Milan and graduate of the Executive Program in Finance at INSEAD, Fontainebleau.
From 1972 to 1973 he was a CNR researcher at the Polytechnic University of Milan. He subsequently worked until 1978 as Executive Vice President of the Transportation Planning Division at Polytecna Harris, an Italian-American engineering company.[1]

From 1979 to 1992, he was a director of McKinsey & Company and a member of the Principal Candidate Evaluation Committee.[2]

In 1993, he founded Value Partners, a global management consulting firm with 6 offices in 5 countries: Milan (headquarters), London, Rio de Janeiro, Buenos Aires, Shanghai and Hong Kong.

In 2005, he set up Value Team, a system integrator specializing in business-critical IT services. In April 2011, Value Team was sold to NTT DATA.

In 2016, he founded Exage, a company with focus on digital Innovation. Exage helps companies to navigate through the challenges of digital transformation and to manage issues such as cyber security, big data, digital strategy, service design, UX/UI, web and mobile development, communication and social media.

Through Forever, his family’s investment company, Giorgio Rossi Cairo is a partner in four other companies: Maus, a producer of automatic fettling, grinding and vertical turning machines; EcorNaturaSì, a leading distribution and retail company of organic food, Centro Medico Sant’Agostino, a health care services provider, and ItalianCreationGroup, an industrial holding that specializes in home design and luxury Italian lifestyle.

External links 
Agire subito, anche se non si sa quando passerà la tempesta Il Sole 24 Ore, Giorgio Rossi Cairo, 30 marzo 2020.
Intervista al collezionista: Giorgio Rossi Cairo Corriere della Sera, Alessandro Martini e Maurizio Francesconi, 8 marzo 2020.
18 buoni motivi per non perdere in treno digitale L’Economia del Corriere della Sera, Federico De Rosa, 11 December 2017.
L’arte contemporanea nelle cantine italiane. Un rapporto che continua Gambero Rosso, Loredana Sottile, 3 November 2017.
Gavi, l'azienda agricola che fa arte tra i vigneti, La Stampa, Daniele Prato, 25 May 2017.
 Vino biodinamico La Raia, l'80% va all'estero - Il Sole 24 Ore Giorgio dell'Orefice, 3 May 2017.
 Industria 4.0 "Vi aiutiamo a fare la rivoluzione" - Corriere Economia Greta Sclaunich, 21 November 2016.
 Ecco cosa chiederei a Renzi Il Sole 24Ore, 18 March 2015.
 Fibra? Allacciatela come Google - MF Gabriele Capolino, 7 March 2015.
Rossi Cairo e Rosso nel capitale di EcorNaturaSì, Il Sole 24Ore, Emanuele Scarci, 14 January 2014.
 China doesn’t understand much about Italy yet, International Business Daily, 13 November 2013.
 Un popolo di terzisti, Milano Finanza, Gabriele Capolino, 13 July 2013.
 Concentrations and quality low-costs: the most effective recipe for Italy to face current economic crisis, Corriere della Sera, Giorgio Rossi Cairo, 5 December 2011.
The brain is not to be delocalized, MF, Gabriele Capolino, 18 June 2011.
 Solutions for Brain Drain. IESE Alumni Event in Milan led by IESE Prof. Alberto Ribera, Milano, Hotel Principe di Savoia, 19 maggio 2011. Giorgio Rossi Cairo takes part to the round table devoted to brain drain and Italian laws preventing it.
 Multi 3G technology will be unified in the end, Business Watch Magazine, Zhou Yebin, 20 July 2009.
Trends in Strategic Consulting in the Face of Globalization, Università degli Studi Milano Bicocca, Symphonya. Emerging Issues in Management, 2007.

References

Italian businesspeople
Living people
Polytechnic University of Milan alumni
Year of birth missing (living people)